The Senate Commerce Subcommittee on Aviation Safety, Operations, and Innovation is a subcommittee within the Senate Committee on Commerce, Science and Transportation. The Subcommittee was formerly known as the Senate Commerce Subcommittee on Aviation, Space and Security, and the Senate Commerce Subcommittee on Aviation Operations and Safety.

Jurisdiction
The Subcommittee on Aviation and Space has jurisdiction over technology, engineering, astronautical and aeronautical research and development; national and civil space policy; civil aviation research, development, and demonstration, and aviation safety and protection of consumers. The subcommittee conducts oversight on the National Aeronautics and Space Administration (NASA), Federal Aviation Administration (FAA), and the civil aviation and civil space policy functions of the Department of Transportation, Department of Commerce, and National Space Council within the Executive Office of the President.

Members, 118th Congress

Source:

Historical subcommittee rosters

117th Congress

116th Congress

Source:

References

External links
Committee on Commerce, Science and Transportation website, Subcommittee page

Commerce Aviation